The Fund of Aid for Youth is a voluntary public association that provides financial and moral support for young citizens of the Republic of Azerbaijan who have suffered during wars.

History 
The Association started to operate on the basis of the Law of the Republic of Azerbaijan "On Public Associations" of November 10, 1992 in accordance with the relevant legislation of the Republic of Azerbaijan, international legal norms and its Statue. It regularly visits and helps around 150 families that some members of them either were killed or injured during “Black January” since 1997. Starting from 1996, the association the poor families during Eid al-Adha holiday. In 2004, the Association get the position of coordinator of UN Economic and Social Council (ECOSOC) over states bordering the Caspian Sea and Central Asia.

General information 
Over the course of its activity every year, the association has provided more than 2000 (two thousand) children with school supplies whose parents are of martyrs, disable or internally displaced persons  as well as internally displaced persons.

It has provided health care services to more than 15,000 kids.

Every year, it pays tuition fees of more than 50 students (mainly the children of martyrs, disabled people and IDP).

Once in every three month, a number of students attends in foreign language courses like English, Arabian and Computer courses without any payment.

It is estimated that the Association promoted to the construction or restoration processes of approximately 30 mosques or temples (mostly local sacred places).

International relations 
The Fund of Aid for Youth of the Republic of Azerbaijan has collaborated with several international and regional organizations such as International Students Associations Federation (in Turkish: UDEF) Turkish Cooperation and Coordination Agency and so on. Moreover, it has built close relationships with around 160 Non-Governmental Organizations. The association is supported by UN Economic and Social Council (ECOSOC) and has full membership and right to vote in National Board of Youth Organizations of the Republic of Azerbaijan.

External links 
 The Fund of Aid for Youth (Azerbaijan)

References 

Government agencies of Azerbaijan
1992 establishments by country
Government of Azerbaijan